is a railway station on the Furano Line in Biei, Hokkaido, Japan, operated by the Hokkaido Railway Company (JR Hokkaido).

Lines
Biei Station is served by the Furano Line.

History
The station opened on September 1, 1899. With the privatization of Japanese National Railways (JNR) on 1 April 1987, the station came under the control of JR Hokkaido.

See also
 List of railway stations in Japan

References

External links

 JR Hokkaido station information 

Railway stations in Hokkaido Prefecture
Railway stations in Japan opened in 1899
Biei, Hokkaido